Eucyclopera is a genus of moths in the family Erebidae. The genus was erected by George Hampson in 1895.

Species
 Eucyclopera abdulla
 Eucyclopera boliviana
 Eucyclopera carpintera
 Eucyclopera chorion
 Eucyclopera cynara
 Eucyclopera cynossema
 Eucyclopera cypris
 Eucyclopera ducei
 Eucyclopera flaviceps
 Eucyclopera minuta
 Eucyclopera plagidisca

References

External links

Nudariina
Moth genera